The E class comprises eight 14,770 twenty-foot equivalent unit (TEU) container ships. Each sister ship bears a name beginning with the letter "E". They are owned by the Danish A. P. Moller-Maersk Group. The ships Emma, Estelle, and Eugen were subjects of TV documentaries. The E class was followed by the larger and more fuel efficient .

Capacity upgrade

In 2016, the decision was made to upgrade the capacity of the ships and make them more efficient at lower speeds. The capacity increase was done by increasing the height of the lashing bridges and adding an extra floor to the accommodation block. This allows the containers to be stacked higher on deck. To help maintain stability, flume tanks were added on the sides of the accommodation block. The work was carried out at Qingdao Beihai Shipbuilding Heavy Industry's shipyard in China.

List of ships

See also

References

Container ship classes
Ships of the Maersk Line
Maersk Line